The 2014 IHF Women's Junior World Championship was the 19th edition of the tournament and took place in Croatia from 28 June to 13 July 2014.

South Korea won the final and their first title by defeating Russia 34–27. Denmark secured the bronze medal after defeating Germany 21–20.

Teams
Africa
 
 
 
Americas
 
 
 
Asia
 
 
 
 
Europe
 
 
 
 
 
 
 
 
 
 
 
 
 
 
Oceania
 No teams qualified

Preliminary round
The schedule was published on 19 May.

All times are local (UTC+2).

Group A

Group B

Group C

Group D

Knockout stage

Championship

Eighthfinals

Quarterfinals

Semifinals

Bronze medal game

Final

5–8th place playoffs

5–8th place semifinals

Seventh place game

Fifth place game

9th–16th place playoffs

9th–16th place quarterfinals

9th–12th place semifinals

Eleventh place game

Ninth place game

13th–16th place playoffs

13th–16th place semifinals

15th place game

13th place game

17–20th place playoffs

17–20th place semifinals

19th place game

17th place game

21–24th place playoffs

21–24th place semifinals

23rd place game

Kazakhstan won the shootout 4–1.

21st place game

Ranking and statistics

Final ranking

Medallists

Awards

All-star team
All-star team is:
MPV: 
Goalkeeper: 
Right wing: 
Right back: 
Central back: 
Left back: 
Left wing: 
Pivot:

Statistics

Topscorers

Source: IHF.info

Top goalkeepers

Source: IHF.info

References

External links
Archive.IHF.info

2014 Women's Junior World Handball Championship
Women's Junior World Handball Championship
2014
Women's handball in Croatia
Junior World Handball Championship
June 2014 sports events in Europe
July 2014 sports events in Europe
2014 in Croatian women's sport